The 1874 McGill Redmen football team represented McGill University during the 1874 college football season. McGill played only one game, against Harvard under McGill's rugby football rules in Montreal.

Schedule

References

McGill
McGill Redbirds football seasons
College football winless seasons
McGill Redmen football
McGill Redmen football